The Brandt mle 27/31 mortar was a regulation weapon of the French army during the Second World War. Designed by Edgar Brandt, it was a refinement of the Stokes mortar. The Brandt mortar was highly influential, being licensed built or copied by numerous countries.

Development history

In 1915, about the same time when English civil engineer Wilfred Stokes turned to developing trench mortars for the troops, French applied artist, silversmith and ironsmith Edgar Brandt did the same while serving in the French Army. He developed two pneumatic weapons, obusier pneumatique Brandt de 60 mm modèle 1915 on a tripod carriage and later also modèle 1916 on a cast aluminium baseplate. Already the first type of the shell (projectile type A) had an aerodynamic teardrop body with flat stabilizers (called vanes or fins) and an obturation groove around its widest part, both features which will define the design of mortar shells in decades to come.

In September 1917 under-secretary of state for inventions sent a circular letter requesting inventors to design a better projectile for the successful Stokes mortar, and Brandt scaled his 60 mm projectile up to 81 mm. Both British and French military adopted the scaled-up design except for the grooves (apparently, their importance wasn't realized at the time) in 1918 as projectile BM (Brandt-Maurice) modèle 1918 (later simplified to FA (fonte aciérée) modèle 1921) and Mk. II HE bomb respectively.

After several years of further development in January 1925 Brandt applied for a patent on a mortar shell with several obturation grooves (of several types), a design which has not in principle changed in the century since. French shell FA modèle 1924/27 soon adopted in place of BM Mle 1918 closely followed the drawing in the patent, and FA modèle 1932 offered even more improvement in range. It was this refined projectile design that made Stokes-Brandt mortar so superiour compared to WWI Stokes: with Brandt-type WWII shells, the latter was able to reach  in range.

Description
The Brandt mle 27/31 was a simple and effective weapon, consisting of a smoothbore metal tube fixed to a base plate (to absorb recoil), with a lightweight bipod mount. The mle 27/31 could be disassembled into 3 loads, plus the ammunitions loads, and a complete crew was 10 men. When a mortar bomb was dropped into the tube, an impact sensitive primer in the base of the bomb would make contact with a firing pin at the base of the tube, and detonate, firing the bomb towards the target. HE and smoke mortar bombs fired by the weapon weighed 3.25 kilograms.

Users

Brandt's innovative projectile design along with the Stokes Mortar provided the pattern for most World War II era light mortars. France, Russia, Italy, China and the United States all had weapons built from this design many times with similar weights, dimensions and performance.

In 1928, an unlicensed Polish copy was made as the Avia wz.28, but due to French pressure it was abandoned in 1931 because the French Brandt company held the patent for the ammunition. The Polish then produced a licensed copy as the wz.31 model (Polish: Moździerz piechoty 81 mm wz. 31) starting in 1935; 1,050 were made in Pruszków. By 1939, the Polish army was equipped with some 1,200 Stokes-Brandt mortars, most of them the newer 1931 model. Each Polish infantry battalion was intended to be equipped with four such mortars, but there were not enough available to fulfill this disposition. The upgraded 1931 version was used by the Polish Army during, amongst others, the Battle of Westerplatte in 1939. An unspecified amount, probably a few hundred, were sold to Republican Spain in 1936-1938.

In Romania, the mortar was licence-produced at the Voina Works in Brașov, with a production rate of 30 pieces per month as of October 1942 (over 1,000 such mortars were built in Romania by mid-1943). 360 mortars captured by the Germans from the French were also received in 1942.

See also
 Reihenwerfer - An armored self-propelled barrage mortar based on the mle 27/31.

Notes

References
Dictionnaire de la Seconde Guerre mondiale, 1982 ed.
 
 
Ferrard, Stéphane. "Les mortier Brandt de 60 et 81 mm dans l'Armée française en 1940"

External links
Mortier de 81 mm Mle 27/31

World War II infantry mortars of France
81mm mortars
Weapons of the Philippine Army
World War II infantry weapons of China
Military equipment introduced in the 1920s